= Khejdadeo =

Khejdadeo Khejra Dev
- village
- Location within Madhya Pradesh Location within India
- Coordinates: 23.350417°N 77.342468°E
- Country: India
- State: Madhya Pradesh
- District: Bhopal
- Tehsil: Huzur

Population (2011)
  - Total: 599
- Time zone: UTC+5:30 (IST)
- ISO 3166 code: MP-IN
- 2011 census code: 482361

Khejdadeo is a village in the Bhopal district of Madhya Pradesh, India. It is located in the Huzur tehsil and the Phanda block.

== Demographics ==
According to the 2011 census of India, Khejdadeo has 122 households. The effective literacy rate (i.e. the literacy rate of population excluding children aged 6 and below) is 70.63%.

Demographics (2011 Census)
	Total	Male	Female
Population	599	302	297
Children aged below 6 years	95	46	49
Scheduled caste	266	131	135
Scheduled tribe	6	4	2
Literates	356	209	147
Workers (all)	267	160	107
Main workers (total)	109	100	9
Main workers: Cultivators	65	62	3
Main workers: Agricultural labourers	39	35	4
Main workers: Household industry workers	1	0	1
Main workers: Other	4	3	1
Marginal workers (total)	158	60	98
Marginal workers: Cultivators	41	11	30
Marginal workers: Agricultural labourers	109	45	64
Marginal workers: Household industry workers	0	0	0
Marginal workers: Others	8	4	4
Non-workers	332	142	190
